Lina Marcela Flórez Valencia (born 2 November 1984 in Carepa, Antioquia) is a Colombian hurdler. At the 2012 Summer Olympics, she competed in the Women's 100 metres hurdles.

Personal bests
100 m: 11.51 (wind: +2.0 m/s) –  Medellín, 25 May 2013
400 m: 54.44 –  Bogotá, 20 July 2013
100 m hurdles: 12.94 (wind: +0.9 m/s) –  Mayagüez, 17 July 2011
400 m hurdles: 58.91 –  Trujillo, 28 November 2013

International competitions

1: Disqualified in the final (false start).

References

External links

1984 births
Living people
Sportspeople from Antioquia Department
Colombian female hurdlers
Olympic athletes of Colombia
Athletes (track and field) at the 2012 Summer Olympics
Athletes (track and field) at the 2016 Summer Olympics
Pan American Games medalists in athletics (track and field)
Athletes (track and field) at the 2011 Pan American Games
World Athletics Championships athletes for Colombia
Pan American Games bronze medalists for Colombia
South American Games silver medalists for Colombia
South American Games bronze medalists for Colombia
South American Games medalists in athletics
Central American and Caribbean Games gold medalists for Colombia
Competitors at the 2014 South American Games
Competitors at the 2014 Central American and Caribbean Games
Central American and Caribbean Games medalists in athletics
Competitors at the 2009 Summer Universiade
Medalists at the 2011 Pan American Games
20th-century Colombian women
21st-century Colombian women